Sorgun YHT railway station, short for Sorgun Yüksek Hızlı Tren station, is a railway station located just northwest of Sorgun, Turkey.

The station will service high-speed trains along the Ankara-Sivas high-speed railway and is expected to open towards the end of 2018. The station will be the first railway link in the region.

References

External links
Ankara-Sivas high-speed railway project 

Railway stations in Yozgat Province
Buildings and structures in Yozgat Province
High-speed railway stations in Turkey
Railway stations under construction in Turkey
Transport in Yozgat Province